Abdelrahman Ramadan (born June 6, 1993) is an Egyptian professional footballer who currently plays as a second striker for Wadi Degla.

References

External links
Abdelrahman Ramadan at KOOORA.com

Living people
1993 births
Egyptian footballers
Association football forwards
Wadi Degla SC players
El Dakhleya SC players
El Entag El Harby SC players
Egyptian Premier League players